Jeune et Jolie is a Michelin Guide-starred French restaurant in Carlsbad, California.

See also 

 List of French restaurants
 List of Michelin starred restaurants in Los Angeles and Southern California

References

External links

French restaurants in California
Michelin Guide starred restaurants in California